The 1991–92 season was Kilmarnock's 90th in Scottish League Competitions.

Scottish First Division

Scottish League Cup

Scottish Cup

Scottish Challenge Cup

See also 
List of Kilmarnock F.C. seasons

References

External links 
https://www.fitbastats.com/kilmarnock/team_results_season.php

Kilmarnock F.C. seasons